A quiz show is a type of game show. It may also refer to:

Quiz Show (film), a 1994 film based on the 1950s quiz show scandals
Quiz Show (video game), a 1976 arcade game
Quiz Show Q, a Korean quiz show
Quiz Show (TV series), an Italian quiz show
"The Quiz Show", an episode of I Love Lucy

See also
1950s quiz show scandals, impropriety in U.S. game shows